John Robert Fitzgerald (born April 16, 1948) is a former American football center in the National Football League (NFL) for the Dallas Cowboys. He was selected in the fourth round of the 1970 NFL Draft. He played college football at Boston College

Early years
Fitzgerald attended Southbridge High School in Southbridge, Massachusetts, where he started as a 315 lb fullback. He also competed in the shot put.

He accepted a football scholarship from Boston College, where he became a two-way tackle, playing both offense and defense during his three-year varsity career.

In 1982, he was inducted into the Boston College Varsity Club Athletic Hall of Fame.

Professional career
Fitzgerald was selected by the Dallas Cowboys in the fourth round (101st overall) of the 1970 NFL Draft. The team played him first as a defensive tackle, before trying him at different offensive line positions. He was waived before the start of the season on September 2. He was later signed to the taxi squad. 

In 1971, he was a backup at offensive guard. In 1972, he was converted into a center during training camp and was the backup behind Dave Manders. 

In 1973, he took over the starting position from Manders, at the time, he was taller than the prototype center. In 1974, he missed 2 games, but was able to start most of the season while limited with an injured knee and an injured elbow.

In 1975, head coach Tom Landry re-introduced to the NFL the shotgun formation. Fitzgerald took great pride in making it work, with his ability to snap the ball 7 yards back without looking.

In 1977, he missed 2 games with knee and ankle injuries. He re-injured the knee during a practice in December, but still managed to play throughout the playoffs. In 1978, he missed 2 games while battling through ankle, shoulder and back spams problems.

In 1979, Fitzgerald named the offensive line as the "Four Irishmen and a Scott", referring to himself, Pat Donovan, Jim Cooper, Tom Rafferty and Herb Scott. 

In 1980, he missed 2 regular season games and 3 playoff contests with shoulder and knee injuries. Robert Shaw was his replacement.

On August 31, 1981, he was placed on the injured reserve list, he was i. On January 11, 1982, he announced his retirement due to injuries and Tom Rafferty being already entrenched at the starting center position.

Fitzgerald never appeared in a Pro Bowl, but still became a central part of a strong offensive line in Dallas for most of the decade. He helped the Cowboys win 2 Super Bowl championships and make playoff appearances every season except one during his time. He played in 138 games over 10 NFL seasons.

References

External links
Boston College bio
Accurate centers

1948 births
Living people
People from Southbridge, Massachusetts
Sportspeople from Worcester County, Massachusetts
Players of American football from Massachusetts
American football centers
Boston College Eagles football players
Dallas Cowboys players